Maple Canyon is a canyon in the northeastern San Pitch Mountains in northern Sanpete County, Utah, United States Nearly all of the canyon, except the western end, is located within the Uinta National Forest.

The canyon offers rock climbing, camping, hiking and general recreation. Many climbing enthusiasts visit this area and have found excellent sport climbing due to the nature of the cobblestone rock.

See also
 List of canyons and gorges in Utah

References

Canyons and gorges of Utah
Landforms of Sanpete County, Utah
Uinta National Forest